David Hauss (born 1 February 1984, in Paris) is a French professional triathlete and bronze medalist at the European Championships 2010. Thanks to his 7th position at the World Championship Series triathlon in London (7 August 2011), together with Laurent Vidal, he qualified for the Olympic Games 2012, where he finished in 4th place, eighteen seconds behind bronze medalist Jonathan Brownlee.

David Hauss is number 6 in the World Championship Series ranking 2011 and thus the best French elite triathlete. At the French Championship (Olympic Distance) in Villiers-sur-Loir (24 September 2011) he placed 10th.

Like Emmie Charayron, Charlotte Morel, Laurent Vidal and other top triathletes, Hauss belongs to the Military Triathlon Team Equipe de France militaire de triathlon.

Hauss also takes part in the prestigious French Club Championship Series Lyonnaise des Eaux. Like many of the French top triathletes, e.g. Emmie Charayron, he represents Lagardère Paris Racing. At the opening triathlon in Nice (24 April 2011) he placed 6th in the individual ranking and was the second best of his club behind Steffen Justus. At Dunkirk and Paris, Hauss was not present.

In 2015, he is part of ECS Triathlon club.

David Hauss lives in Les Avirons, La Réunion, and in Saint-Raphaël, Var. The Swiss triathlete Melanie Annaheim is his fiancée.

ITU Competitions 
In the nine years from 2002 to 2010, David Hauss took part in 55 ITU competitions and achieved 29 top ten positions.
The following list is based upon the official ITU rankings and the ITU Athletes's Profile Page.
Unless indicated otherwise, the following events are triathlons (Olympic Distance) and refer to the Elite category.

DNF = did not finish · BG = the sponsor British Gas

Notes

External links 
 Hauss' Website in French
 French Triathlon Federation in French
 

1984 births
Living people
French male triathletes
Sportspeople from Paris
Triathletes at the 2012 Summer Olympics
Olympic triathletes of France